Levamisole induced necrosis syndrome (LINES) is a complication of adulterated cocaine recognized in 2011, caused by the use of levamisole as a cutting agent for cocaine. Spontaneous bruising of the earlobes is considered characteristic of this condition, but lesions can present anywhere on the body.

Description

Levamisole 
Levamisole, a derivative of imidazothiazole, was previously approved as an  antihelminthic and immunomodulator. It experienced some usage for the treatment of rheumatoid arthritis but was primarily used for the treatment of parasitic infections. It was withdrawn from the U.S. market in early 2000 because of adverse health events. However, it is still approved in the United States as an antihelminthic agent in veterinary medicine.

Levamisole toxicity in cocaine supply 
Levamisole has become a common additive to illicit cocaine. It is thought to  intensify the "high" by releasing dopamine in the brain, acts as a bulking agent, and is a difficult adulterant to recognize. Potential risks of levamisole-laced cocaine include neutropenia, agranulocytosis, arthralgias, retiform purpura, skin necrosis, and fever. The skin necrosis associated with levamisole toxicity ranges from leukocytoclastic vasculitis to occlusive vasculopathy. Several cases of severe agranulocytosis associated with cocaine use have been reported since 2006. With the recently recognized dermal disease, the face and ears are commonly affected, especially the bilateral helices and cheeks. However, there have also been case reports of involvement of  the abdomen, chest, lower buttocks and legs.

Diagnosis

Initial case report 
LINES was first described in a 54-year-old male with history of hypothyroidism who presented to an urgent care facility with bilateral axillary adenopathy and severe malaise. Incision and drainage of the nodes was performed and he was discharged home with sulfamethoxazole/trimethoprim for presumed methicillin-resistant Staphylococcus aureus (MRSA) infection.

The patient subsequently developed a temperature of 37.5 °C, expressed rigors, and night sweats. He returned to the ED the next day and on further history admitted to 3 weeks of "snorting 6–8 lines of coke a day" and smoking marijuana every evening to "come down". He was hospitalized and treated with cefepime, doxycycline, and fluconazole empirically. The next day erythematous painful papules appeared on his trunk, arms, face, and ears. Blood cultures were negative. There was prominent necrosis of the cheek region, nose, and lips with complete sparing of the back. Skin biopsy revealed extensive small vessel thrombosis throughout the superficial and deep dermal plexuses with perivascular mononuclear inflammatory infiltrate and a few neutrophils surrounding the vessels. Erythrocyte sedimentation rate was elevated at 35 mm/hour; cardiolipin IgM was weakly positive at 16.3; C4 was decreased at 10 mg/dl; antinuclear antibodies were negative and p-ANCA was reactive. Coagulation studies were within normal limits. There was an elevated d-dimer of 17.54 mg/mL and platelets were slightly decreased. The patient's urine drug screen was positive for cannabis but not cocaine.

Treatment
Methylprednisolone was started and wound care was initiated. Epidermal necrosis then evolved to myonecrosis extending from midthigh to the foot which necessitated below knee amputation of the right extremity. The patient also required allografts to his chest and abdomen and autografts to his face and left lower extremity.

History 

In 2011 a team of physicians from University of South Florida Morsani College of Medicine in Tampa, FL (under the attending service of John T. Sinnott, MD FACP) recognized an association of skin necrosis with use of levamisole adulterated cocaine. The mnemonic LINES (Levamisole-Induced NEcrosis Syndrome) was coined to name the syndrome because the name was descriptive, reminds one of a “line” of cocaine, and is easily remembered.  Thus it is self exemplifying.

References 

Skin conditions resulting from physical factors
Cocaine
Medical mnemonics